The following is the list of squads for each of the 24 teams competing in the 2010 FIBA World Championship for Women, held in the Czech Republic between September 23 and October 3, 2010.  Each team selected a squad of 12 players for the tournament.

Group A

Head coach:  Carrie Graf

Head coach:  Anatoly Buyalski

Head coach:  Allison McNeill

Head coach:  Tom Maher

Group B

Head coach:  Pierre Vincent

Head coach:  Kostas Missas

Head coach:  Diop Magette

Head coach:  Geno Auriemma

Group C

Head coach:  Carlos Colinas

Head coach:  Jung Duk-hwa

Head coach:  Jose Ruiz

Head coach:  José Ignacio Hernández

Group D

Head coach:  Eduardo Pinto

Head coach:  Lubor Blažek

Head coach:  Tomohide Uchiumi

Head coach:  Igor Grudin

See also
2010 Wheelchair Basketball World Championship squads

External links
 Roster Overview

Squads
FIBA Women's Basketball World Cup squads